Petersaurach Nord station is a railway station in the north of the municipality of Petersaurach, located in the Ansbach district in Middle Franconia, Germany.

References

Nuremberg S-Bahn stations
Railway stations in Bavaria
Railway stations in Germany opened in 2014
Buildings and structures in Ansbach (district)